2006 elections to Redditch Borough Council were held on 4 May 2006. One third of the council was up for election and the Labour Party lost overall control of the council to no overall control.

After the election, the composition of the council was:
Labour 14
Conservative 11
Liberal Democrat 3
British National Party 1

Election result

Ward results

References
2006 Redditch election result
Ward results
Labour loses control of council

2006
2006 English local elections
2000s in Worcestershire